OlievenHoutBosch (also known as 'Oliven"/ 'Stop12") is a township in Centurion, south of Pretoria in Gauteng, South Africa, close to Midrand on the R55 route. It was established in the 1990s It was an informal settlement called Choba at extension 27 . It is densely populated and is one of the fastest-growing townships in the province.

References

Suburbs of Centurion, Gauteng
Townships in Gauteng